Norman Holmes (born October 5, 1949) is an American former professional tennis player of the 1970s.

Holmes played collegiate tennis for the University of Georgia and was the first person in the program's history to earn four All-SEC selections (1968-71). He had a best singles world ranking of 70 while competing on the professional tour, reaching the singles third round of the 1971 US Open and 1973 Wimbledon Championships.

References

External links
 
 

1949 births
Living people
American male tennis players
Georgia Bulldogs tennis players